Garments of Truth is a 1921 American silent comedy film directed by George D. Baker and starring Gareth Hughes, Ethel Grandin and John Steppling.

Cast
 Gareth Hughes as 	Lester Crope
 Ethel Grandin as 	Catherine Willis
 John Steppling as Deacon Ballantine
 Frances Raymond as 	Mrs. Ballantine
 Margaret McWade as 	Mrs. Crope
 Graham Pettie as 	Mr. Crope
 Frank Norcross as 	James H. Barnes
 Harry Lorraine as Alex Hawley
 Walter Perry as Nat Sears
 Herbert Fortier as 	Dr. G. B. Palmer
 Herbert Prior as 	Dr. W.H. Palmer
 Ilean Hume as Tilly Snooks
 Sylvia Ashton as 	Widow Jones
 Eric Mayne as 	Dr. Mills
 Effie Conley as 	Millie Thomas

References

Bibliography
 Connelly, Robert B. The Silents: Silent Feature Films, 1910-36, Volume 40, Issue 2. December Press, 1998.
 Munden, Kenneth White. The American Film Institute Catalog of Motion Pictures Produced in the United States, Part 1. University of California Press, 1997.

External links
 

1921 films
1921 comedy films
1920s English-language films
American silent feature films
Silent American comedy films
American black-and-white films
Films directed by George D. Baker
Metro Pictures films
1920s American films